Bang is the sixth studio album by James Gang, released in 1973. This is the first James Gang album featuring lead guitarist Tommy Bolin after Domenic Troiano left the band.

Critical reception

Writing for Allmusic, critic David Jeffries wrote the album "feels less like a band album and more like talented studio musicians on the loose, but die-hard fans of either the Gang or the late Bolin will enjoy it, if only in fits and starts."

Track listing
All songs by Tommy Bolin and John Tesar except where noted.
 "Standing in the Rain" (Tommy Bolin) – 5:05
 "The Devil Is Singing Our Song" – 4:22
 "Must Be Love" (Bolin, Jeff Cook) – 3:48
 "Alexis" (Bolin, Cook) – 5:07
 "Ride the Wind" (Bolin, Roy Kenner) – 3:45
 "Got No Time for Trouble" – 3:47
 "Rather Be Alone With You (Song For Dale)" (Kenner) – 2:05
 "From Another Time" – 4:00
 "Mystery" – 6:10

Personnel 
Roy Kenner – lead vocals, percussion
Tommy Bolin – guitars, backing vocals, lead vocal on "Alexis," synthesizer
Dale Peters – bass guitar, backing vocals, percussion
Jim Fox – drums, backing vocals, percussion, keyboards

Sales chart performance
Album - Billboard (United States)

References

James Gang albums
1973 albums
Atco Records albums